Revere High School may refer to:
Revere High School (Massachusetts)
Revere High School (Ohio)